Nigel Gibson is a British activist, a scholar specialising in philosophy and author whose work has focussed, in particular, on Frantz Fanon. Edward Said described Gibson's work as "rigorous and subtle". He has been described as a leading figure in Fanon scholarship.

Biography
Gibson was born in London and was an active militant in the 1984–1985 Miners' Strike. While in London he also met South African exiles from the Black Consciousness Movement and, in conversation with the exiles, developed some influential academic work on the movement. He later moved to the United States where he worked with Raya Dunayevskaya in the Marxist Humanism movement, studied with Raymond Geuss and Edward Said and became an important theorist of Frantz Fanon on whom he has written extensively. Along with Noam Chomsky, Naomi Klein, Slavoj Zizek, and others, Gibson endorsed the statement in support of the South African shack dweller organization, Abahlali baseMjondolo, against state violence.

Books
Gibson has co-edited a major collection of work on Theodor Adorno with Andrew N. Rubin and is a co-editor of a collection of work on Steve Biko.  His recent work has been marked by a return to an interest in Frantz Fanon (see his edited collection Living Fanon) with a particular focus on the reception of Fanon in popular struggles in South Africa (see Fanonian Practices in South Africa). His Fanon:The Postcolonial Imagination was translated into Arabic in 2013.
His most recent works are Frantz Fanon, Psychiatry and Politics written with Roberto Beneduce published by Rowman and Littlefield with an African edition published by Wits University Press and Fanon Today: Reason and Revolt of the Wretched of the Earth published by Daraja Press.

Affiliation
He was previously the Assistant Director of African Studies at Columbia University and a Research Associate in African-American Studies at Harvard University. He is currently Professor at the Marlboro Institute of Interdisciplinary Studies, Emerson College (Boston, MA)  and an Honorary Research Professor at the Humanities Unit of the University currently known as Rhodes. He is a member of the Committee for Academic Freedom in Africa.

Prizes
In 2009 he was awarded the Fanon prize by the Caribbean Philosophical Association. According to the association "Gibson has set a high standard in Fanon studies and informed political thought on Africa and the Caribbean."

Bibliography

Books
Rethinking Fanon: The Continuing Legacy, Humanity Books, 1999.
Contested Terrains and Constructed Categories: Contemporary Africa in Focus (with George C. Bond), Westview, 2002.
Adorno: A Critical Reader (with Andrew N. Rubin), Blackwell, 2002.
Fanon: The Postcolonial Imagination, Polity, 2003.
Challenging Hegemony: Social Movements and the Quest for a New Humanism in Post-Apartheid South Africa, Africa World Press, 2006.
Biko Lives: Contesting the Legacies of Steve Biko (with Andile Mngxitama and Amanda Alexander), Palgrave MacMillan, 2008.
Fanonian Practices in South Africa: From Steve Biko to Abahlali baseMjondolo, UKZN Press and Palgrave MacMillan, 2011
Living Fanon: Global Perspectives, Palgrave MacMillan, 2011
Frantz Fanon, Psychiatry and Politics (with Roberto Beneduce), Rowman and Littlefield International and Wits UP, 2017
Fanon and the Rationality of Revolt, Daraja Press, 2020
Fanon Today: Reason and Revolt of the Wretched of the Earth (Editor), Daraja Press, 2021

Selected online articles
Black Consciousness 1977–1987: The Dialectics of Liberation in South Africa

The Pitfalls of South Africa's Liberation

Thoughts about doing Fanonism in the 1990s

The limits of black political empowerment: Fanon, Marx, 'the Poors' and the 'new reality of the nation' in South Africa

Is Fanon Relevant? Translations, the postcolonial imagination and the second stage of total liberation

Zabalaza, Unfinished struggles against apartheid: the shackdwellers' movement in Durban

A New Politics of the Poor Emerges from South Africa's Shanty Towns

Is Fanon Relevant? Towards an alternative introduction to the 'Damned of the Earth

Upright and free: Fanon in South Africa, from Biko to Abahlali baseMjondolo

Fanonian Practices and the politics of space in postapartheid South Africa: The Challenge of the Shack Dwellers Movement

Democracy's everyday death: South Africa's quiet coup co-authored with Raj Patel

Egypt and the revolution in our minds, Pambazuka, 18 February 2011

What Happened to the "Promised Land"? A Fanonian Perspective on Post-Apartheid South Africa, Antipode, 2011

50 years later: Fanon's legacy Pambazuka, 21 December 2011

Thinking Fanon, 50 years later: Fanonian translations in and beyond ‘Fanon Studies, Pambazuka, 14 March 2012

20 Years After the L.A. Riots, Revisiting the Rationality of Revolt, Truthout, 12 May 2012

 Frantz Fanon and the Arab Uprisings: An interview with Nigel Gibson, Jadaliyya 17 August 2012

The Marikana Massacre: A Turning Point for South Africa?, Truthout, 1 September 2012

A Wholly Other Time: Fanon the Revolutionary and the Question of Organization, South Atlantic Quarterly, Winter 2013

References

External links
 Review of Gibson's Fanon & the Post-Colonial Imagination
 Review of a Public Lecture by Nigel Gibson

Year of birth missing (living people)
Living people
Harvard University staff
Marxist theorists
British pan-Africanists
British humanists
Marxist humanists
Fanon scholars
British activists
English Africanists